Blanche Christine Olschak (24 July 1913 – 25 June 1989) was an Austrian journalist and writer, Tibetan specialist and wrote the first comprehensive encyclopedia of women in the world.

Biography
Blanche Christine Olschak was born on 24 July 1913 in Vienna, Austria, to Austro-Hungarian parents, Joseph Olschak and Lilly Helene Büchelen. She studied at the University of Graz, earning a PhD in economics and political science in 1937 and the following year married the engineer Robert Schneiter. She began to focus on Asian topics, specifically Tibetology, Buddhist philosophy and psychology, and Early Central Asian History and wrote about women in Asian societies. In 1945, Olschak fled to Salzburg, and worked as an editor at the Alpen-Journal, but her husband became a prisoner of war in 1946 and died in a concentration camp. At that time, Olschak fled again, going to Zurich, Switzerland.

Shortly after arriving in Switzerland, Olschak published Das Mädchen Katharina; Miniaturen aus den Jugendjahren der grossen Kaiserin (1947). She became a foreign correspondent for several Austrian newspapers and traveled throughout the Far East to China, the Himalayas, Japan, Java, Korea, Mongolia and Tibet to conduct research. In 1949, she was hired by Encyclic Verlag of Zurich to create the first encyclopedia of women that had ever been published. The work was comprehensive and covered cultural, economic, political and sociological aspects of women's lives from throughout the world. In the mid-1950s, the project was looking for a publisher to extend the work to the Americas and inspired Ángela Acuña Braun to create a historical social study of Costa Rican Women Through Four Centuries, which took Acuña nearly two decades to compile and publish.

In 1961, she founded an organization, "Verein für tibetische Heimstätten in der Schweiz", for receiving Tibetan refugees and assisting with immigration into Switzerland in conjunction with the Red Cross. Under her own initiative, she took study courses with Constantin Regamey and Geshé Thupten Wangyal, attending conferences and writing scientific papers on Tibetan culture. For her scientific studies, she was awarded the title of professor by the Austrian Federal Ministry of Science and Research in 1981 and awarded a Golden Doctorate in 1987.

Olschak died on 25 June 1989 in Zurich, Switzerland.

Selected works
All of her early works were in German. In the late-1960s works began appearing in both English and French. She continued publishing until her death and several works were published posthumously.

References

External links
 Worldcat publications list

1913 births
1989 deaths
Austrian women writers
Writers from Vienna
20th-century women writers
20th-century Austrian writers
Austrian women philosophers
20th-century Austrian journalists
20th-century Austrian philosophers
Austrian emigrants to Switzerland